The Amur stickleback (Pungitius sinensis) is a species of fish in the family Gasterosteidae. This freshwater,  brackish water, or marine benthopelagic fish is usually 6.5 cm (up to 9  cm) in length. It is widespread in East Asia: off the Korean peninsula, northeast and north China, Japan, the Kuril Islands, the Kamchatka peninsula, and the basin of the Amur River.

References

Amur stickleback
Fish of East Asia
Freshwater fish of China
Freshwater fish of Japan
Fish of Russia
Fish of Korea
Amur stickleback